Mattias Ekström (born 14 July 1978 in Falun, Sweden) is a racing driver from Sweden. He competed in the Deutsche Tourenwagen Masters for Audi from 2001 until his retirement in 2018, and has been competing in the FIA World Rallycross Championship, also for Audi, since its inception in 2014. He is a FIA World Rallycross Champion, a two-time DTM champion and a four-time winner of the Race of Champions.

Career

Ekström debuted in karting in 1993. The next years he competed at the Renault 5 Turbo Cup, winning the championship in 1996. The driver progressed to the Swedish Touring Car Championship in 1997, finishing runner-up with a Volvo 850. In 1998 he drove a Ford Mondeo, claiming four podiums. Ekström won the 1999 championship driving an Audi A4 quattro. He switched rides again in 2000, finishing third with a factory Volvo S40.

In 2001, Ekström joined the Abt Junior team to compete at the Deutsche Tourenwagen Masters. Driving Audi TT, he finished 8th in his debut season, third in 2002, and fourth in 2003.

In 2004, Ekström won the 2004 Deutsche Tourenwagen Masters, defeating Mercedes rivals Gary Paffett and Christijan Albers. In the 2005 DTM season he finished second behind Paffett.

Ekström has also been active in rallying and the World Rally Championship. He debuted in the WRC in 1999 and recorded his best result at the 2005 Swedish Rally, finishing tenth in a Škoda factory team Fabia WRC. At the 2005 Race of Champions, Ekström won the Nations' Cup with Tom Kristensen. In 2006, he won the Henri Toivonen Memorial Trophy and earned the title Champion of Champions at the 2006 Race of Champions, by winning over Sébastien Loeb in the individual event finals.

After a poor 2006 season, Ekström won his second DTM title in 2007 and went on to win the 2007 Race of Champions, beating Michael Schumacher in the individual finals. In 2009, he won the Race of Champions once more beating the seven-time world champion in the final.

Ekström became the first Scandinavian driver to take part in the NASCAR Sprint Cup Series in June 2010. He raced for Team Red Bull at Infineon Raceway, substituting for Brian Vickers in the No. 83 Toyota Camry, as Vickers was inactive for the remainder of the 2010 season due to blood clots.  Ekström was able to finish 21st and lead 7 laps mostly remaining in the top 5 or top 10 the whole day. However he did so ex-aequo with another Scandinavian driver as Jan Magnussen from Denmark also took part in the same race, eventually finishing ahead of Ekström. Ekström also ran the Air Guard 400 at Richmond International Raceway where he started 42nd and finished 31st.

Ekström followed in the footsteps of his father Bengt by branching out into rallycross in 2013, competing in the Swedish round of the European Rallycross Championship in Höljes, finishing second in a Volkswagen Polo. He subsequently announced that he was establishing his own EKS RX team to compete in the FIA World Rallycross Championship. The team made their debut at the Norwegian round of the 2014 World Rallycross Championship season in Hell, fielding a pair of Audi S1s for Ekström and 2013 Junior World Rally Champion Pontus Tidemand.

Ekström is widely regarded as one of the most versatile drivers in the world. He also participated in the Bathurst 1000 in 2013 alongside Andy Priaulx in a 'wildcard' entry. The entry qualified 19th and finished 10th, with former 1000 winner turned commentator Mark Skaife hailing his efforts, stating that he was "one of the best debutants I have seen", as well as being "the best international driver since Jacky Ickx". Ickx won the race on debut with Allan Moffat in 1977.

In January 2018, Ekström announced that he would be retiring from DTM, to concentrate on running his rallycross team, now with added support from Audi Sport. However, at the end of the season Audi decided to withdraw its works programme, leaving Ekström's team in limbo, with some of the team's Audi S1 were sold to the privateers. Eventually the team stayed as one-car privateer after signing Krisztián Szabó from Hungary, with Ekström does a wildcard entry at the inaugural World Rallycross event in Spa Francochamps.

Ekström returns to World Rallycross Championship in 2020 season, initially as a wildcard for the first two rounds in Sweden for the JC Race Teknik team, which coincidentally, running two EKS RX's Audi S1. He replaced Latvian Jānis Baumanis who was unable to do the full season with the team due to funding issues caused by COVID-19 pandemic. Ekström ended up signed with the team for another two double-header rounds in Finland and Latvia, which he got two wins and five podiums out of six events so far, making him the championship contender along with fellow Swede Johan Kristoffersson.

Racing record

Complete Swedish Touring Car Championship results
(key) (Races in bold indicate pole position) (Races in italics indicate fastest lap)

Complete Super Tourenwagen Cup results
(key) (Races in bold indicate pole position) (Races in italics indicate fastest lap)

Complete Deutsche Tourenwagen Masters results
(key) (Races in bold indicate pole position) (Races in italics indicate fastest lap)

1 Shanghai was a non-championship round.
† Retired, but was classified as he completed 75% of the winner's race distance.
‡ As Ekström was a guest driver, he was ineligible for championship points.

NASCAR
(key) (Bold – Pole position awarded by qualifying time. Italics – Pole position earned by points standings or practice time. * – Most laps led.)

Sprint Cup Series

Complete V8 Supercar results 
(key) (Races in bold indicate pole position) (Races in italics indicate fastest lap)

Complete WRC results
(key)

Complete Global RallyCross Championship results
(key)

Supercar

Complete FIA European Rallycross Championship results
(key)

Supercar

Complete FIA World Rallycross Championship results
(key)

Supercar/RX1

Dakar Rally results

Bathurst 1000 results

Complete Extreme E results
(key)

References

External links

 
 

Living people
1978 births
People from Falun
Swedish racing drivers
24 Hours of Spa drivers
Deutsche Tourenwagen Masters champions
Deutsche Tourenwagen Masters drivers
Swedish Touring Car Championship drivers
Blancpain Endurance Series drivers
NASCAR drivers
Supercars Championship drivers
Swedish expatriate sportspeople in Switzerland
European Rallycross Championship drivers
World Rallycross Championship drivers
Global RallyCross Championship drivers
Dakar Rally drivers
Extreme E drivers
Sportspeople from Dalarna County
Abt Sportsline drivers
Audi Sport drivers
W Racing Team drivers
Nürburgring 24 Hours drivers
Cupra Racing drivers
Zengő Motorsport drivers
Škoda Motorsport drivers